Tarakaniv Fort is a 19th-century fortress located next to a Tarakaniv village, Dubno district of Rivne Oblast, Ukraine. It was commissioned and built by Alexander II of the Russian Empire and can be found next to Lviv-Kyiv Highway M06 on the right bank of the Ikva river. The fortress could accommodate up to 800 people.

History

Building 

After Third Partition of Poland in the end of the 19th century (1795)  Russian and Austrian empires started to share a common border. In order to secure the western frontiers of newly annexed lands Czarist Government under the rule of Alexander II decided to build a fortress next to a railroad going from Kyiv to Lviv, not far from Dubno city. The building however was postponed for about 50 years due to French and Crimean wars.

The building of hillforts and provisional earthworks of the fortress commenced in the 1860s under supervision of Crimean war (1853) veteran Eduard Totleben. In 1873 about 66 million Rubles were levied by the government for the project. In the 1870s through 80s the fortress was actively built. Besides stoneworks and bricks used for primary material of the building, the concrete, previously unknown in Russian empire building material, was also used. Materials were delivered by railroad and almost all works were done by sub-contractors. By the 1890s the fortress was finished and Emperor Alexander II with family have visited it to make a final assessment.

On February 2, 1905, stationed troops at the fortress rebelled due to officers abusing soldiers and poor food supply conditions. The rebellion was suppressed, troops dissolved and sentenced to a hard labor; the fortress was turned into a military prison with disciplinary battalion of  deployed instead.

World War I 
In 1912, Dmitry Karbyshev, a military engineer visited the fortress as part of official commission to inspect it.

In the beginning of 1915, during the World War I, the fortress was used by the Southwestern Front troops of the Russian Empire as a defensive fortification until Great Retreat by Russians in 1915. It was beaten back shortly after Brusilov offensive in summer of 1916, when 4th Austria-Hungary army was pushed out of the fortress. Allegedly 200 soldiers of the Austrian army are buried in the vicinity of the fortress as result of the battle.

Interwar period 

In 1920, the fortress was occupied by Poles and Red Army's 1st Cavalry Army led by Semyon Budyonny attempted an attack on it but ultimately failed. Poles managed to flee to the local Gorbachin island as Russians advanced and left it behind. Over 1000 Bolsheviks fell dead allegedly and some poles were captured.

World War II 
No battle for fortress took place during the World War II. However, it was refurbished in 1933-1935 by Poles who had deployed garrison there, but in June 1939, they lost it to advancing German troops.

Postwar 
In 1965, ministry of trade of Ukrainian Soviet Socialist Republic made several attempts to convert the fortress into a canned food warehouse but failed due to very high humidity and evaporation levels. Carpathian Military District also made a few futile attempts to utilize free space but also failed.

Status 
As of beginning of the 21st century the fortress remains in a dire state, mostly due to negligence and highly wet environment of the surrounding areas. In 2017 it was reported to be closed to public visits because of poor condition but ban is not enforced.

Characteristics 
It has 7 underground levels with a series of tunnels, kitchen accommodation, laundry, church, morgue, phone lines, 3 waterwells, and sewages. It also had small warehouses for gunpowder and medical rooms. There are also a range of military accommodations and fortifications both for troops and artillery. The rear side has a deep ditch which in emergency event could have been crossed by a retracting bridge built in 1893. The fortress could accommodate up to 800 people. The entrance was located on the east and south sides.

The walls of the fortress bear many century old hand-made inscriptions.

Gallery

See also 

 Castles and Fortresses of Western Ukraine
 List of castles in Ukraine

Notelist

References

External links 

 Fortress Plans on Ukrainian forum, August 19, 2007 (Ukrainian, Russian)
 20th century photos of the Fortress (archived), (Photos of 1916)

Forts in Ukraine